David John Richardson (born 16 September 1959) is a South African former cricketer and the former CEO of the International Cricket Council.

Playing career
Richardson played 42 Test matches and 122 One Day Internationals as a wicket-keeper for South Africa, and represented Eastern Province and Northern Transvaal in various domestic competitions.

Richardson succeeded Ray Jennings as South Africa's number one 'keeper in 1986 for their Unofficial "Test" matches. For the first seven years after South Africa returned from isolation, Richardson was a permanent fixture as wicket-keeper, his trademark sun hat and brown gloves were very recognisable. He was also a gritty batsman, scoring a maiden and his only Test century (109) against New Zealand at Cape Town in 1994–95.

Administrative career
In January 2002, Richardson was appointed as the International Cricket Council's first general manager. In June 2012, Richardson was appointed as the new chief executive officer of the ICC. Using his influence he ensured that pitch preparation of neutral venues were in the ICC's hands.

Following the death of Australian Test cricketer Phillip Hughes in November 2014, Richardson said that any action on bowling bouncers in cricket matches would be "unlikely".

Personal life
Richardson is a qualified lawyer and remained in cricket after retirement as a business agent for several players. His son, Michael, played county cricket in England for Durham.

References

External links

1959 births
Living people
South African cricketers
South Africa Test cricketers
South Africa One Day International cricketers
Eastern Province cricketers
Northerns cricketers
South African Universities cricketers
Cricketers from Johannesburg
South African people of British descent
White South African people
Wicket-keepers